The meridian 80° east of Greenwich is a line of longitude that extends from the North Pole across the Arctic Ocean, Asia, the Indian Ocean, the Southern Ocean, and Antarctica to the South Pole.

The 80th meridian east forms a great circle with the 100th meridian west.

There is also an 80 Degrees East cafe in Nanganallur, Chennai, India named after this longitude.

From Pole to Pole 
Starting at the North Pole and heading south to the South Pole, the 80th meridian east passes through:

{| class="wikitable plainrowheaders"
! scope="col" width="120" | Co-ordinates
! scope="col" | Country, territory or sea
! scope="col" | Notes
|-
| style="background:#b0e0e6;" | 
! scope="row" style="background:#b0e0e6;" | Arctic Ocean
| style="background:#b0e0e6;" |
|-
| style="background:#b0e0e6;" | 
! scope="row" style="background:#b0e0e6;" | Kara Sea
| style="background:#b0e0e6;" |
|-
| 
! scope="row" | 
| Krasnoyarsk Krai — Ushakov Island
|-
| style="background:#b0e0e6;" | 
! scope="row" style="background:#b0e0e6;" | Kara Sea
| style="background:#b0e0e6;" | Passing just west of Dikson Island, Krasnoyarsk Krai, 
|-valign="top"
| 
! scope="row" | 
| Krasnoyarsk Krai Yamalo-Nenets Autonomous Okrug — from  Krasnoyarsk Krai — from  Yamalo-Nenets Autonomous Okrug — from Khanty-Mansi Autonomous Okrug — from  Tomsk Oblast — from  Novosibirsk Oblast — from  Altai Krai — from 
|-
| 
! scope="row" | 
|
|-
| 
! scope="row" | 
| Xinjiang – for about 18 km
|-
| 
! scope="row" | 
|
|-
| 
! scope="row" | 
|
|-
| 
! scope="row" | 
| Xinjiang
|-
| 
! scope="row" | Aksai Chin
|-
| 
! scope="row" | 
| Tibet
|-valign="top"
| 
! scope="row" | Aksai Chin
|-valign="top"
| 
! scope="row" | 
| Uttarakhand Uttar Pradesh — from  Madhya Pradesh — from  Maharashtra — from  Telangana — from  Andhra Pradesh — from  Tamil Nadu — from 
|-
| style="background:#b0e0e6;" | 
! scope="row" style="background:#b0e0e6;" | Indian Ocean
| style="background:#b0e0e6;" | Bay of Bengal
|-
| 
! scope="row" | 
| Jaffna Peninsula
|-
| style="background:#b0e0e6;" | 
! scope="row" style="background:#b0e0e6;" | Indian Ocean
| style="background:#b0e0e6;" | Palk Strait
|-
| 
! scope="row" | 
|
|-
| style="background:#b0e0e6;" | 
! scope="row" style="background:#b0e0e6;" | Indian Ocean
| style="background:#b0e0e6;" |
|-
| style="background:#b0e0e6;" | 
! scope="row" style="background:#b0e0e6;" | Southern Ocean
| style="background:#b0e0e6;" |
|-
| 
! scope="row" | Antarctica
| Australian Antarctic Territory, claimed by 
|-
|}

See also
79th meridian east
81st meridian east

References

e080 meridian east